Milton Bearden is an American author, film consultant and former CIA officer. Bearden served as the president and CEO of the Asia-Africa Projects Group, a Washington, D.C.-based resource development and advisory services firm from 2010 to 2015. He has been an author and film consultant since 1998. As of 2016, Bearden lives in Austin, Texas with his French-born wife, Marie-Catherine, a retired university professor, and now the president and founder of AE & Associates, an inter-cultural business protocol and etiquette consulting group.

Early life and education 
Bearden was born in Oklahoma and spent his early years in Washington, where his father worked on the Manhattan Project, and later moved with his family to Houston, Texas. After serving in the United States Air Force, he joined the CIA in 1964. Bearden studied Chinese at the Yale Institute of Far Eastern Languages and earned a Bachelor of Arts degree in linguistics from the University of Texas at Austin.

Career

CIA 
During his 30-year career with the CIA, Bearden was a station chief in Pakistan, Nigeria, Sudan and Germany. He served as the CIA's Chief of Station in Pakistan from 1986 to 1989, and played a role in managing Agency's provision of arms, intelligence and training to the ISI which in turn provided the Afghan mujahedeen fighting occupying Soviet forces. He was also responsible for collecting intelligence on Pakistan's then-covert nuclear weapons program.

Bearden appeared several times in the BBC Documentary by Adam Curtis called The Power of Nightmares where he talked of his involvement with the Mujahadeen, the Afghan Arabs and how he was assigned to the role by William Casey, the then current Director of Central Intelligence. According to Bearden, Casey told him that Afghanistan seemed to be possibly one of the keys to winning. Casey said "'I want you to go to Afghanstian, I want you to go next month and I will give you what ever you need to win... He gave me the Stinger missiles and a billion dollars!"

Bearden was one of the senior CIA officials criticized in the 1994 "snitch fax". The fax was allegedly written by ex-CIA officer David Sullivan, and addressed to members of Congress investigating CIA issues, including the Aldrich Ames spy case.

He was later appointed the Chief of the Soviet/East European Division during the collapse of the Soviet Union. He received the Distinguished Intelligence Medal, the Intelligence Medal of Merit and the Donovan Award for his CIA service. He received the Federal Cross of Merit from the President of the German Federal Republic for his service in Germany at the end of the Cold War.

Writer and commentator 

Since retiring, Bearden has written books based on his experiences, commented on current events, and appeared on television, including Secret Warriors (Discovery Channel), Covert Action (BBC), The Power of Nightmares (BBC2), and Heroes Under Fire (The History Channel). Although generally supportive of the CIA and its mission, he has also been outspoken in his criticism of US actions in the War on Terrorism. He was co-author of one book with James Risen. Bearden is a frequent contributor to the op-ed pages of the New York Times, the Los Angeles Times and The Wall Street Journal, and has contributed to Foreign Affairs and to the book about the September 11 attacks, How Did This Happen?, published by PublicAffairs. He also serves as a consultant for CBS News.

In August 1999, he argued that the threat posed by Osama bin Laden had been blown out of proportion. He called for the U.S. government to renounce "any plans for a unilateral military action against Osama bin Laden or for another cruise missile attack on Afghanistan." Bearden also called for a "serious dialogue" with the Taliban and said that they "have no more obligation to extradite Osama bin Laden to the United States than, say, the French do in the case of Ira Einhorn or the Israelis in the case of Samuel Scheinbein -- both of whom are fugitives from American justice in capital murder cases".

Following the September 11 attacks, he coined the term "graveyard of empires" to refer to Afghanistan, invoking Afghan victories against outside invaders which had significant political consequences for the invading nations. Bearden predicted that relying on the Northern Alliance against majority ethnic groups would create "a brutal, general civil war that would continue until the United States simply gave up".

Bearden has provided commentary for several documentaries films and television series, including Nightline, 60 Minutes, Biography, Uncovered: The War on Iraq, The Power of Nightmares: The Rise of the Politics of Fear, National Geographic: Inside 9/11, Our Own Private Bin Laden, The Eighties, Afghanistan 1979, Spy Wars, and Afghanistan: The Wounded Land.

Film consultant 

He worked with Robert De Niro on Ronin and Meet the Parents, and worked with De Niro and screenwriter Eric Roth (Forrest Gump, The Insider) on The Good Shepherd, released in December 2006. Universal Studios and De Niro's Tribeca Productions have optioned The Main Enemy as a planned sequel to The Good Shepherd. He also worked with director Mike Nichols on the film Charlie Wilson's War, released in December 2007.

See also 
Operation Cyclone
Michael Pillsbury

Books 
 The Black Tulip: A Novel of War in Afghanistan (1998) 
 The Main Enemy, The Inside story of the CIA's Final showdown with the KGB, with James Risen (2003) 
 How Did This Happen, Terrorism and The New War (2001) (contributor)

References

External links 
 Sunday (Australia) online chat
 PBS interview (conducted late 1998 or early 1999 )

American Cold War spymasters
People of the Central Intelligence Agency
People of the Soviet–Afghan War
Living people
American spies
Cold War spies
United States Air Force airmen
Recipients of the Order of Merit of the Federal Republic of Germany
Recipients of the Distinguished Intelligence Medal
American expatriates in Pakistan
Year of birth missing (living people)